The Académie des lettres du Québec is a national academy for Quebec writers.

It was founded as the Académie canadienne-française in 1944 by Victor Barbeau and a group of writers. In 1992 it changed its name to the Académie des lettres du Québec.

It brings together writers and intellectuals of all disciplines. It can have up to 42 members.

Prizes awarded by the Academy
Prix Victor-Barbeau  
Prix Alain-Grandbois
Prix Ringuet
Médaille de l'Académie des lettres du Québec
Prix Molson du roman (1983-1994)

Founding members
Marius Barbeau
Victor Barbeau
Roger Brien
Robert Charbonneau
Robert Choquette
Marie-Claire Daveluy
Léo-Paul Desrosiers
Guy Frégault
Alain Grandbois
Lionel Groulx
François Hertel
Louis Lachance
Gustave Lamarche
Rina Lasnier
Philippe Panneton
Robert Rumilly

Deceased members
André Barbeau
Gérard Bessette
Roméo Boucher
Michel Brunet
René de Chantal
Roger Duhamel
Fernand Dumont
Jean Éthier-Blais
Jean-Charles Falardeau
Jean-Louis Gagnon
Germaine Guèvremont
André Laurendeau
Andrée Maillet
Jean Ménard
Émile Ollivier
Léopold Richer
Simone Routier
Paul Toupin

Current members
Jacques Allard
Jean-Louis Baudoin
Yves Beauchemin
Gérald A. Beaudoin
Lise Bissonnette
Marie-Claire Blais
Gérard Bouchard
André Brochu
Nicole Brossard
Louis Caron
Paul Chamberland
Jean-Claude Corbeil
Pierre de Grandpré
Denise Desautels
Hélène Dorion
Marcel Dubé
Louise Dupré
Jean-Pierre Duquette
Jacques Folch-Ribas
Madeleine Gagnon
Lise Gauvin
Suzanne Jacob
Naïm Kattan
Monique LaRue
Georges Leroux
Claude Lévesque
Louise Maheux-Forcier
Antonine Maillet
Clément Marchand
Réginald Martel
Madeleine Monette
Pierre Nepveu
Madeleine Ouellette-Michalska
Jean-Guy Pilon
Hubert Reeves
André Ricard
Edmond Robillard
Jean Royer
Fernande Saint-Martin
Marcel Trudel
Jean-Pierre Wallot

Honorary members
Vassilis Alexakis (Greece/France)
Alain Bosquet (France)
Andrée Chedid (Egypt/France)
Maryse Condé (Guadeloupe/United States)
Vénus Khoury-Ghata (Lebanon/France)
Milan Kundera (Czech Republic/France)
Eduardo Manet (Cuba/France)
Pierre Mertens (French-speaking community of Belgium)

References
Canadian Encyclopedia - Académie des lettres du Québec
Conseil des arts et des lettres du Québec - Concise Québec cultural directory - Académie des lettres du Québec

External links
Official website

Professional associations based in Quebec
Culture of Quebec
French-language literature in Canada
1944 establishments in Quebec
Canada
Canadian writers' organizations